Claudius Ptolemy (AD) was a Roman mathematician, astronomer, astrologer, geographer, and music theorist, who wrote about a dozen scientific treatises, three of which were of importance to later Byzantine, Islamic, and Western European science. The first is the astronomical treatise now known as the Almagest, although it was originally entitled the Mathēmatikē Syntaxis or Mathematical Treatise, and later known as The Greatest Treatise. The second is the Geography, which is a thorough discussion on maps and the geographic knowledge of the Greco-Roman world. The third is the astrological treatise in which he attempted to adapt horoscopic astrology to the Aristotelian natural philosophy of his day. This is sometimes known as the Apotelesmatika (lit. "On the Effects") but more commonly known as the Tetrábiblos, from the Koine Greek meaning "Four Books", or by its Latin equivalent Quadripartite.

Unlike most ancient Greek mathematicians, Ptolemy's writings (foremost the Almagest) never ceased to be copied or commented upon, both in Late Antiquity and in the Middle Ages. However, it is likely that only a few truly mastered the mathematics necessary to understand his works, as evidenced particularly by the many abridged and watered-down introductions to Ptolemy's astronomy that were popular among the Arabs and Byzantines alike.

Biography

Ptolemy lived in or around the city of Alexandria, in the Roman province of Egypt under Roman rule, had a Latin name, which is generally taken to imply he was also a Roman citizen, cited Greek philosophers, and used Babylonian observations and Babylonian lunar theory. In half of his extant works, Ptolemy addresses a certain Syrus, a figure of whom almost nothing is known but who likely shared some of Ptolemy's astronomical interests. 

The 14th-century astronomer Theodore Meliteniotes gave his birthplace as the prominent Greek city Ptolemais Hermiou in the Thebaid. This attestation is quite late, however, and there is no evidence to support it. 

Claudius Ptolemy died in Alexandria around 168.

Naming and nationality 

Ptolemy's Greek name, Ptolemaeus (Ptolemaîos), is an ancient Greek personal name. It occurs once in Greek mythology and is of Homeric form. It was common among the Macedonian upper class at the time of Alexander the Great and there were several of this name among Alexander's army, one of whom made himself pharaoh in 323 BC: Ptolemy I Soter, the first pharaoh of the Ptolemaic Kingdom. Almost all subsequent pharaohs of Egypt, with a few exceptions, were named Ptolemies until Egypt became a Roman province in 30 BC, ending the Macedonian family's rule.

The name Claudius is a Roman name, belonging to the gens Claudia; the peculiar multipart form of the whole name Claudius Ptolemaeus is a Roman custom, characteristic of Roman citizens. Several historians have made the deduction that this indicates that Ptolemy would have been a Roman citizen. Gerald Toomer, the translator of Ptolemy's Almagest into English, suggests that citizenship was probably granted to one of Ptolemy's ancestors by either the emperor Claudius or the emperor Nero.

The 9th century Persian astronomer Abu Ma'shar al-Balkhi mistakenly presents Ptolemy as a member of Ptolemaic Egypt's royal lineage, stating that the descendants of the Alexandrine general and Pharaoh Ptolemy I Soter were wise "and included Ptolemy the Wise, who composed the book of the Almagest". Abu Ma'shar recorded a belief that a different member of this royal line "composed the book on astrology and attributed it to Ptolemy". We can infer historical confusion on this point from Abu Ma'shar's subsequent remark: "It is sometimes said that the very learned man who wrote the book of astrology also wrote the book of the Almagest. The correct answer is not known." Not much positive evidence is known on the subject of Ptolemy's ancestry, apart from what can be drawn from the details of his name, although modern scholars have concluded that Abu Ma'shar's account is erroneous. It is no longer doubted that the astronomer who wrote the Almagest also wrote the Tetrabiblos as its astrological counterpart. In later Arabic sources, he was often known as "the Upper Egyptian", suggesting he may have had origins in southern Egypt. Arabic astronomers, geographers and physicists referred to his name in Arabic as Baṭlumyus.

Ptolemy wrote in ancient Greek and can be shown to have utilized Babylonian astronomical data. He might have been a Roman citizen, but was ethnically either a Greek or at least a Hellenized Egyptian.

Astronomy
Astronomy was the subject to which Ptolemy devoted the most time and effort; about half of all the works that survived deal with astronomical matters, and even others such as the Geography and the Tetrabiblos have significant references to astronomy.

Mathēmatikē Syntaxis 

Ptolemy's Mathēmatikē Syntaxis (Ancient Greek: Μαθηματικὴ Σύνταξις, lit. "Mathematical Systematic Treatise"), better known as the Almagest, is the only surviving comprehensive ancient treatise on astronomy. Although Babylonian astronomers had developed arithmetical techniques for calculating and predicting astronomical phenomena, these were not based on any underlying model of the heavens; early Greek astronomers, on the other hand, provided qualitative geometrical models to "save the appearances" of celestial phenomena without the ability to make any predictions.

The earliest person that attempted to merge these two approaches was Hipparchus, who produced geometric models that not only reflected the arrangement of the planets and stars but could be used to calculate celestial motions. Ptolemy, following Hipparchus, derived each of his geometrical models for the Sun, Moon, and the planets from selected astronomical observations done in the spanning of more than 800 years; however, many astronomers have for centuries suspected that some of his models' parameters were adopted independently of observations.

Ptolemy presented his astronomical models alongside convenient tables, which could be used to compute the future or past position of the planets. The Almagest also contains a star catalogue, which is a version of a catalogue created by Hipparchus. Its list of forty-eight constellations is ancestral to the modern system of constellations but, unlike the modern system, they did not cover the whole sky (only what could be seen with the naked eye). For over a thousand years, the Almagest was the authoritative text on astronomy across Europe, the Middle East, and North Africa.

The Almagest was preserved, like many extant Greek scientific works, in Arabic manuscripts; the modern title is thought to be an Arabic corruption of the Greek name Hē Megistē Syntaxis (lit. "The greatest treatise"), as the work was presumably known in Late Antiquity. Because of its reputation, it was widely sought and translated twice into Latin in the 12th century, once in Sicily and again in Spain. Ptolemy's planetary models, like those of the majority of his predecessors, were geocentric and almost universally accepted until the reappearance of heliocentric models during the scientific revolution.

Handy Tables 
The Handy Tables (Ancient Greek: Πρόχειροι κανόνες) are a set of astronomical tables, together with canons for their use. To facilitate astronomical calculations, Ptolemy tabulated all the data needed to compute the positions of the Sun, Moon and planets, the rising and setting of the stars, and eclipses of the Sun and Moon, making it a useful tool for astronomers and astrologers. The tables themselves are known through Theon of Alexandria’s version. Although Ptolemy's Handy Tables do not survive as such in Arabic or in Latin, they represent the prototype of most Arabic and Latin astronomical tables or zījes.

Additionally, the introduction to the Handy Tables survived separately from the tables themselves (apparently part of a gathering of some of Ptolemy's shorter writings) under the title Arrangement and Calculation of the Handy Tables.

Planetary Hypotheses 

The Planetary Hypotheses (Ancient Greek: Ὑποθέσεις τῶν πλανωμένων, lit. "Hypotheses of the Planets") is a cosmological work, probably one of the last written by Ptolemy, in two books dealing with the structure of the universe and the laws that govern celestial motion. Ptolemy goes beyond the mathematical models of the Almagest to present a physical realization of the universe as a set of nested spheres, in which he used the epicycles of his planetary model to compute the dimensions of the universe. He estimated the Sun was at an average distance of 1,210 Earth radii (now known to actually be ~23,450 radii), while the radius of the sphere of the fixed stars was 20,000 times the radius of the Earth.

The work is also notable for having descriptions on how to build instruments to depict the planets and their movements from a geocentric perspective, much like an orrery would have done for a heliocentric one, presumably for didactic purposes.

Other works 
The Analemma is a short treatise where Ptolemy provides a method for specifying the location of the sun in three pairs of locally orientated coordinate arcs as a function of the declination of the sun, the terrestrial latitude, and the hour. The key to the approach is to represent the solid configuration in a plane diagram that Ptolemy calls the analemma.

In another work, the Phaseis (Risings of the Fixed Stars), Ptolemy gave a parapegma, a star calendar or almanac, based on the appearances and disappearances of stars over the course of the solar year.

The Planisphaerium (Ancient Greek: Ἅπλωσις ἐπιφανείας σφαίρας, lit. 'Simplification of the Sphere') contains 16 propositions dealing with the projection of the celestial circles onto a plane. The text is lost in Greek (except for a fragment) and survives in Arabic and Latin only.

Ptolemy also erected an inscription in a temple at Canopus, around 146–147 AD, known as the Canobic Inscription. Although the inscription has not survived, someone in the sixth century transcribed it and manuscript copies preserved it through the Middle Ages. It begins: "To the saviour god, Claudius Ptolemy (dedicates) the first principles and models of astronomy," following by a catalogue of numbers that define a system of celestial mechanics governing the motions of the sun, moon, planets, and stars.

Cartography

Ptolemy's second most well-known work is his Geographike Hyphegesis (Ancient Greek: Γεωγραφικὴ Ὑφήγησις; lit. "Guide to Drawing the Earth"), known as the Geography, a handbook on how to draw maps using geographical coordinates for parts of the Roman world known at the time. He relied on previous work by an earlier geographer, Marinus of Tyre, as well as on gazetteers of the Roman and ancient Persian Empire. He also acknowledged ancient astronomer Hipparchus for having provided the elevation of the north celestial pole for a few cities. Although maps based on scientific principles had been made since the time of Eratosthenes (c. 276–195 BC), Ptolemy improved on map projections.

The first part of the Geography is a discussion of the data and of the methods he used. Ptolemy notes the supremacy of astronomical data over land measurements or travelers' reports, though he possessed these data for only a handful of places. Ptolemy's real innovation, however, occurs in the second part of the book, where he provides a catalogue of 8,000 localities he collected from Marinus and others, the biggest such database from antiquity. About 6,300 of these places and geographic features have assigned coordinates so that they can be placed in a grid that spanned the globe. Latitude was measured from the equator, as it is today, but Ptolemy preferred to express it as climata, the length of the longest day rather than degrees of arc: the length of the midsummer day increases from 12h to 24h as one goes from the equator to the polar circle. One of the places Ptolemy noted specific coordinates for was the now-lost Stone Tower which marked the midpoint on the ancient Silk Road, and which scholars have been trying to locate ever since.

In the third part of the Geography, Ptolemy gives instructions on how to create maps both of the whole inhabited world (oikoumenē) and of the Roman provinces, including the necessary topographic lists, and captions for the maps. His oikoumenē spanned 180 degrees of longitude from the Blessed Islands in the Atlantic Ocean to the middle of China, and about 80 degrees of latitude from Shetland to anti-Meroe (east coast of Africa); Ptolemy was well aware that he knew about only a quarter of the globe, and an erroneous extension of China southward suggests his sources did not reach all the way to the Pacific Ocean.

It seems likely that the topographical tables in the second part of the work (Books 2–7) are cumulative texts, which were altered as new knowledge became available in the centuries after Ptolemy. This means that information contained in different parts of the Geography is likely to be of different dates, in addition to containing many scribal errors. However, although the regional and world maps in surviving manuscripts date from c. 1300 AD (after the text was rediscovered by Maximus Planudes), there are some scholars who think that such maps go back to Ptolemy himself.

Astrology

Ptolemy wrote an astrological treatise, in four parts, known by the Greek term Tetrabiblos (lit. "Four Books") or by its Latin equivalent Quadripartitum. Its original title is unknown, but may have been a term found in some Greek manuscripts, Apotelesmatiká (biblía), roughly meaning "(books) on the Effects" or "Outcomes", or "Prognostics". As a source of reference, the Tetrabiblos is said to have "enjoyed almost the authority of a Bible among the astrological writers of a thousand years or more". It was first translated from Arabic into Latin by Plato of Tivoli (Tiburtinus) in 1138, while he was in Spain. 

Much of the content of the Tetrabiblos was collected from earlier sources; Ptolemy's achievement was to order his material in a systematic way, showing how the subject could, in his view, be rationalized. It is, indeed, presented as the second part of the study of astronomy of which the Almagest was the first, concerned with the influences of the celestial bodies in the sublunary sphere. Thus explanations of a sort are provided for the astrological effects of the planets, based upon their combined effects of heating, cooling, moistening, and drying. Ptolemy dismisses other astrological practices, such as considering the numerological significance of names, that he believed to be without sound basis, and leaves out popular topics, such as electional astrology (interpreting astrological charts to determine courses of action) and medical astrology, for similar reasons.

The great popularity that the Tetrabiblos did possess might be attributed to its nature as an exposition of the art of astrology, and as a compendium of astrological lore, rather than as a manual. It speaks in general terms, avoiding illustrations and details of practice. 

A collection of one hundred aphorisms about astrology called the Centiloquium, ascribed to Ptolemy, was widely reproduced and commented on by Arabic, Latin, and Hebrew scholars, and often bound together in medieval manuscripts after the Tetrabiblos as a kind of summation. It is now believed to be a much later pseudepigraphical composition. The identity and date of the actual author of the work, referred to now as Pseudo-Ptolemy, remains the subject of conjecture.

Music

Ptolemy wrote an earlier work entitled Harmonikon (Ancient Greek: Ἁρμονικόν), known as the Harmonics, on music theory and the mathematics behind musical scales in three books. It begins with a definition of harmonic theory, with a long exposition on the relationship between reason and sense perception in corroborating theoretical assumptions. After criticizing the approaches of his predecessors, Ptolemy argues for basing musical intervals on mathematical ratios (in contrast to the followers of Aristoxenus), backed up by empirical observation (in contrast to the overly theoretical approach of the Pythagoreans).

Ptolemy introduces the harmonic canon, an experimental apparatus that would be used for the demonstrations in the next chapters, then proceeds to discuss Pythagorean tuning. Pythagoreans believed that the mathematics of music should be based on the specific ratio of 3:2, whereas Ptolemy merely believed that it should just generally involve tetrachords and octaves. He presented his own divisions of the tetrachord and the octave, which he derived with the help of a monochord. The book ends with a more speculative exposition of the relationships between harmony, the soul (psyche), and the planets (harmony of the spheres).

Although Ptolemy's Harmonics never had the influence of his Almagest or Geography, it is nonetheless a well-structured treatise and contains more methodological reflections than any other of his writings. During the Renaissance, Ptolemy's ideas inspired Kepler in his own musings on the harmony of the world (Harmonice Mundi, Appendix to Book V).

Optics

The Optica (Ancient Greek: Ὀπτικά), known as the Optics, is a work that survives only in a somewhat poor Latin version, which, in turn, was translated from a lost Arabic version by Eugenius of Palermo. In it, Ptolemy writes about properties of sight (not light), including reflection, refraction, and colour. The work is a significant part of the early history of optics and influenced the more famous and superior 11th-century Book of Optics by Ibn al-Haytham. Ptolemy offered explanations for many phenomena concerning illumination and colour, size, shape, movement, and binocular vision. He also divided illusions into those caused by physical or optical factors and those caused by judgmental factors. He offered an obscure explanation of the sun or moon illusion (the enlarged apparent size on the horizon) based on the difficulty of looking upwards.

The work is divided into three major sections. The first section (Book II) deals with direct vision from first principles and ends with a discussion of binocular vision. The second section (Books III-IV) treats reflection in plane, convex, concave, and compound mirrors. The last section (Book V) deals with refraction and includes the earliest surviving table of refraction from air to water, for which the values (with the exception of the 60° angle of incidence) show signs of being obtained from an arithmetic progression. However, according to Mark Smith, Ptolemy's table was based in part on real experiments.

Ptolemy's theory of vision consisted of rays (or flux) coming from the eye forming a cone, the vertex being within the eye, and the base defining the visual field. The rays were sensitive, and conveyed information back to the observer's intellect about the distance and orientation of surfaces. Size and shape were determined by the visual angle subtended at the eye combined with perceived distance and orientation. This was one of the early statements of size-distance invariance as a cause of perceptual size and shape constancy, a view supported by the Stoics.

Philosophy 
Although mainly known for his contributions to astronomy and other scientific subjects, Ptolemy also engaged in epistemological and psychological discussions across his corpus. He wrote a short essay entitled On the Criterion and Hegemonikon (Ancient Greek: Περὶ Κριτηρίου καὶ Ἡγεμονικοῡ), which may have been one of his earliest works. Ptolemy deals specifically with how humans obtain scientific knowledge (i.e., the "criterion" of truth), as well as with the nature and structure of the human psyche or soul, particularly its ruling faculty (i.e., the hegemonikon). Ptolemy argues that, to arrive at the truth, one should use both reason and sense perception in ways that complement each other. On the Criterion is also noteworthy for being the only one of Ptolemy's works that is devoid of mathematics.

Elsewhere, Ptolemy affirms the supremacy of mathematical knowledge over other forms of knowledge. Like Aristotle before him, Ptolemy classifies mathematics as a type of theoretical philosophy; however, Ptolemy believes mathematics to be superior to theology or metaphysics because the latter are conjectural while only the former can secure certain knowledge. This view is contrary to the Platonic and Aristotelian traditions, where theology or metaphysics occupied the highest honour. Despite being a minority position among ancient philosophers, Ptolemy's views were shared by other mathematicians such as Hero of Alexandria.

Named after Ptolemy
There are several characters or items named after Ptolemy, including:
 The crater Ptolemaeus on the Moon
 The crater Ptolemaeus on Mars
 The asteroid 4001 Ptolemaeus
 Messier 7, sometimes known as the Ptolemy Cluster, an open cluster of stars in the constellation of Scorpius
 The Ptolemy stone used in the mathematics courses at both St. John's College campuses in the U.S.
 Ptolemy's theorem on distances in a cyclic quadrilateral, and its generalization, Ptolemy's inequality, to non-cyclic quadrilaterals
 Ptolemaic graphs, the graphs whose distances obey Ptolemy's inequality
 Ptolemy Project, a project at University of California, Berkeley, aimed at modeling, simulating and designing concurrent, real-time, embedded systems
 Ptolemy Slocum, actor

Works
 
 
 
 
 
 
 
 
 Planisphaerium, medieval Arabic translations and an English translation thereof, https://www.sciamvs.org/files/SCIAMVS_08_037-139_Sidoli_Berggren.pdf

See also

 Equant
 Messier 7 – Ptolemy Cluster, star cluster described by Ptolemaeus
 Pei Xiu
 Ptolemy's Canon – a dated list of kings used by ancient astronomers.
 Ptolemy's table of chords
 Zhang Heng

Footnotes

References

 
 Berggren, J. Lennart, and Alexander Jones. 2000. Ptolemy's Geography: An Annotated Translation of the Theoretical Chapters. Princeton and Oxford: Princeton University Press. .
 
 Hübner, Wolfgang, ed. 1998. Claudius Ptolemaeus, Opera quae exstant omnia Vol III/Fasc 1: ΑΠΟΤΕΛΕΣΜΑΤΙΚΑ (= Tetrabiblos). De Gruyter.  (Bibliotheca scriptorum Graecorum et Romanorum Teubneriana). (The most recent edition of the Greek text of Ptolemy's astrological work, based on earlier editions by F. Boll and E. Boer.)
 Lejeune, A. (1989) L'Optique de Claude Ptolémée dans la version latine d'après l'arabe de l'émir Eugène de Sicile. [Latin text with French translation]. Collection de travaux de l'Académie International d'Histoire des Sciences, No. 31. Leiden: E.J.Brill.
 
 Nobbe, C. F. A., ed. 1843. Claudii Ptolemaei Geographia. 3 vols. Leipzig: Carolus Tauchnitus. (Until  Stückelberger (2006), this was the most recent edition of the complete Greek text.)
 Peerlings, R.H.J., Laurentius F., van den Bovenkamp J.,(2017) The watermarks in the Rome editions of Ptolemy's Cosmography and more, In Quaerendo 47: 307–327, 2017.
 Peerlings, R.H.J., Laurentius F., van den Bovenkamp J.,(2018) New findings and discoveries in the 1507/8 Rome edition of Ptolemy’s Cosmography, In Quaerendo 48: 139–162, 2018.
 Ptolemy. 1930. Die Harmonielehre des Klaudios Ptolemaios, edited by Ingemar Düring. Göteborgs högskolas årsskrift 36, 1930:1. Göteborg: Elanders boktr. aktiebolag. Reprint, New York: Garland Publishing, 1980.
 Ptolemy. 2000. Harmonics, translated and commentary by Jon Solomon. Mnemosyne, Bibliotheca Classica Batava, Supplementum, 0169–8958, 203. Leiden and Boston: Brill Publishers. 
 .
 
 Smith, A.M. (1996) Ptolemy's theory of visual perception: An English translation of the Optics with introduction and commentary. Transactions of the American Philosophical Society, Vol. 86, Part 2. Philadelphia: The American Philosophical Society.
 .
 Stevenson, Edward Luther (trans. and ed.). 1932. Claudius Ptolemy: The Geography. New York: New York Public Library. Reprint, New York: Dover, 1991. (This is the only complete English translation of Ptolemy's most famous work. Unfortunately, it is marred by numerous mistakes and the placenames are given in Latinised forms, rather than in the original Greek).
 Stückelberger, Alfred, and Gerd Graßhoff (eds). 2006. Ptolemaios, Handbuch der Geographie, Griechisch-Deutsch. 2 vols. Basel: Schwabe Verlag. . (Massive 1018 pp. scholarly edition by a team of a dozen scholars that takes account of all known manuscripts, with facing Greek and German text, footnotes on manuscript variations, color maps, and a CD with the geographical data)
 
 Ptolemy's Almagest, Translated and annotated by G. J. Toomer. Princeton University Press, 1998
 Sir Thomas Heath, A History of Greek Mathematics, Oxford : Clarendon Press, 1921.

External links

 Ptolemy's Tetrabiblos at LacusCurtius (Transcription of the Loeb Classical Library's English translation)
 Entire Tetrabiblos of J.M. Ashmand's 1822 translation.
 Ptolemy's Geography at LacusCurtius (English translation, incomplete)
 Extracts of Ptolemy on the country of the Seres (China) (English translation)
 Almagest books 1–13 The complete text of Heiberg's edition (PDF) Greek.
 Almagest books 1–6  with preface  at archive.org
 Geography, digitised codex made in Italy between 1460 and 1477, translated to Latin by Jacobus Angelus at Somni. Also known as codex valentinus, it is the oldest manuscript of the codices with maps of Ptolemy with the donis projections.
 Hieronymi Cardani ... In Cl. Ptolemaei ... IIII De astrorum judiciis From the Rare Book and Special Collection Division at the Library of Congress
 Almagestū Cl. Ptolemei From the Rare Book and Special Collection Division at the Library of Congress
 
 Franz Boll (1894), "Studien über Claudius Ptolemaeus. Ein Beitrag zur Geschichte der griechischen Philosophie und Astrologie" In: Neue Jahrbücher für Philologie und Pädagogik, Supplementband 21,2. Teubner, Leipzig, pp. 49–244.
 
 
 
 
 
 
 
 Java simulation of the Ptolemaic System – at Paul Stoddard's Animated Virtual Planetarium, Northern Illinois University
 
 Epicycle and Deferent Demo – at Rosemary Kennett's website at the Syracuse University
 Flash animation of Ptolemy's universe. (best in Internet Explorer)
 Online Galleries, History of Science Collections, University of Oklahoma Libraries. High resolution images of works by Ptolemy in .jpg and .tiff format.
 Codex Vaticanus graecus 1291 (Vat.gr.1291) in Vatican Digital Library - Complete reproduction of the 9th century manuscript of Ptolemy's Handy Tables.
 

 

100 births
170 deaths
1st-century Romans
2nd-century Romans
2nd-century philosophers
2nd-century poets
Egyptian calendar
Ancient Greek astrologers
Ancient Greek astronomers
Ancient Greek mathematicians
Ancient Greek music theorists
Astrological writers
Claudii
Egyptian astronomers
Ancient Egyptian mathematicians
Epigrammatists of the Greek Anthology
2nd-century Egyptian people
Ancient Greek geographers
Roman-era geographers
2nd-century geographers
2nd-century mathematicians
2nd-century astronomers